Sobha Surendran is an Indian politician from the state of Kerala, allied to the Bharatiya Janata Party (BJP). Sobha is the first woman politician from Kerala BJP to hold a position at the national level. She has acted as the state president of BJP Mahila Morcha. She also serves on the board of directors of the Chennai Petroleum Corporation.

Personal life
Sobha was born in the Wadakkanchery, Thrissur district, Kerala. Sobha is married to K. K. Surendran, a Bharatiya Janata Party politician also from Wadakkanchery.

Political career
Sobha was the state president of the Mahila Morcha. She was a member of the party's core committee and was the state general secretary of the party. She was later moved from state general secretary to vice-president.

Elections
In 2016, there was a close contest and she came second with 40,087 votes.
Sobha, as the party's state general secretary, was then contesting both legislative assembly and general elections on a BJP ticket.

Over the years her election results have been improving the party vote share.

In 2019, Sobha contested the Attingal constituency and came third against Adoor Prakash of the Indian National Congress. In 2014 BJP got 92000 votes and in 2019 BJP got 248000 votes in Attingal.

In 2021, for the Assembly election, Sobha Surendran contested the Kazhakkoottam constituency in the Thiruvananthapuram district and lost to Kadakampally Surendran CPI(M) candidate.

Controversies
After being appointed state vice-president Sobha Surendran was reluctant to take up the post, which triggered a controversy within the Party.  Her statement about welcoming the Muslim League into the NDA, in an interview, had caused confusion in the BJP. The BJP state president K. Surendran refuted her statement. In 2018, during the BJP's protest march against the arrest of K. Surendran in Kannur, Sobha made provocative comments against the police and  threatened SP Yathish Chandra. She was arrested by the Kerala Police.

Protests and struggles
Sobha Surendran was one of the key figures arrested by police in the Sabarimala protests. She fasted for 48 hours in support of the agitation by PSC job seekers in the PSC rank lists in the  Secretariat. Subsequently, Sobha met with the Kerala Governor and received assurances that he would act in favor of the job aspirants.

In November 2020, Sobha alleged that the party president, K. Surendran, had organised a political conspiracy against her, both personally and politically, to end her political career. She wrote a complaint letter to BJP national president JP Nadda and union home minister Amit Shah.

References

External links
 

Living people
Women in Kerala politics
Bharatiya Janata Party politicians from Kerala
21st-century Indian women politicians
21st-century Indian politicians
People from Thrissur district
Year of birth missing (living people)